Samuel Dickie (June 6, 1851 – November 5, 1925) was an American politician who was active in the Prohibition Party.

Life

Samuel Dickie was born on June 6, 1851, to William Dickie and Jane McNabb, Scottish immigrants, in Burford, Ontario. In 1858, his family immigrated to the United States and moved to Lansing, Michigan. In 1869, he enrolled into Albion College and graduated with a bachelor of arts in 1872 as the valedictorian of his class. In 1877, he became a mathematics and astronomy professor at Albion College and would remain in those positions until December 1887. On December 22, 1878, he married Mary Augusta Brockway, the daughter of W. H. Brockway who helped found Albion College, and would later had four children with her.

Politics

In 1887, he was selected to replace John B. Finch as chairman of the Prohibition Party following Finch's death and remained in the position until 1900. In 1886, he ran in the Michigan gubernatorial election and received the highest amount of support for any Michigan Prohibition gubernatorial candidate. On March 20, 1896, he was given the Prohibition nomination for Mayor of Albion, Michigan and won with a plurality of thirteen votes.

In 1896, he presided over the Prohibition national convention and was one of the leaders of the narrow gauger faction which only wanted to include the prohibition of alcohol in the party's platform and successfully defeated the broad gaugers under the leadership of John St. John. On December 31, 1899, he resigned from the chairmanship of the party so that he and John G. Woolley could purchase and worked together on the New Voice, a prohibition journal, and did so until 1901.

In 1909, he debated Milwaukee Mayor David S. Rose twice and was considered the winner in both debates. During the second debate Calhoun County officially became a dry county and during the night an anti-prohibition mob surrounded his home, with only his daughter inside, and threatened to burn the building down until students from Albion College drove them away.

Following the passage of the Eighteenth Amendment, banning the sale and consumption of alcohol, he left the Prohibition Party and joined the Republican Party.

Later life

In 1898, Daniel Striker, the chairman and treasurer of the Albion College Endowment Fund committee, died and was replaced by Dickie. In 1901, he was elected to succeed John P. Ashley as president of Albion College and would serve in that position until his retirement in 1921. In 1923, he was made the first president of the Albion Chamber of Commerce.

In 1921, he became a naturalized United States citizen after his passport was rejected while planning to give a European speaking tour. On November 5, 1925, he died from a heart attack at his home while sleeping.

Electoral history

References

External links

1851 births
1925 deaths
19th-century American politicians
20th-century American politicians
Albion College alumni
Albion College faculty
American temperance activists
Pre-Confederation Canadian emigrants to the United States
Canadian people of Scottish descent
Mayors of places in Michigan
Michigan Prohibitionists
Michigan Republicans
People from Albion, Michigan